Karan Kayastha is a community of Kayastha that inhabit Orissa and Mithila region, a region now divided between India and Nepal.

History and migration 
Eminent archeologist, BP Sinha explains that duty of Karana was rajaseva and durgantapuraraksha. They held high position in Oriya society with them being mentioned highly in early scriptures. They adopted the profession of writing and were merged in the Kayastha community. He also mentions that the word Kayastha and Karana are often used synonymously in the scriptures of Orissa.
Sahay explains their migration from present day Bihar to Orissa and Nepal. The Karanas held important positions in Magadh bureaucracy and due to regime change had to move North into the Terai and Nepal and South into Orissa and southern India. Those in the periphery of Magadh moved to Himalayan regions including the Terai. While those that moved south came to be later known as Karana in Orissa, Karanam in Andhra, Karuneeka in Karnataka and Karunageer in TamilNadu.

Eminent epigraphist of Archaeological Survey of India, Dineshchandra Sircar, mentions that several historial edicts and inscriptions have been found in the relevant geographic locations that show that the terms Karana, Karanin, Karaneeka, Karanakas, Karaneegars are used to represent bureaucratic range from clerks to ministers. Significant among these are Minor Rock Edict No. II, Kanas plates of Lokavigraha, Ghugrahati copperplate of Samacharadeva, Tipper copperplate of Lokanath etc.

Karan of Bihar 

Maithil Karan Kayasth  are  also known as Tirhutiya Kayasth. They follow the Panji system of genealogies, which is indigenous to a few ethnicities of the region. Verma explains that these help in understanding their migration over several centuries as several manuscripts of Panjis are possessed by various panjikars of Bihar which deal with such genealogies. They are written in Tirhuta script on palm leaves or old indigenous paper mainly dealing with Mulgrams and the transmigration to subsequent places of living. 
The early records also mention Nanyadev of Karnat dynasty, whose rule began in 1057 AD as also mentioned in Simraungadh inscription.

Indigenous to the region is also the Mithila paintings that mainly females of some ethnicities including the Karans elaborate in their domestic-ritual space.

Karana of Odisha 
Main article : Karana

Thurston suggests that the Karanas were first invited to Orissa by the King Yayati Keshari in about 5th century A. D. 
Sircar suggests that as shown in the Bhajas inscription, a list of individuals involved in land records contains a phrase 'Brahmana-Karana-Puroga-Nivasi' which may be good indication of their social status then. Historian RS Sharma also mention that Loknatha, a Karana, was also referred to as a Brahmin in inscriptions, but they were ranked lower in most literature.
Even in the current scenario they hold good political power in Odisha including several Chief Ministers in recent years.

Karanam or Sistakarnam of Andhra 
Sircar mentions that they mostly dealt with accounting, bureaucracy, teaching etc.
They are believed to have migrated from Orissa to the flourishing Vijayanagar empire where they also were heads of villages mostly in Northern costal Andhra, with quite a few ministers, warriors, reformers and administrators. Sahay mentions that the Sistakarnams perform the Upanayan ceremony and hold the belief of descent from Shri Chitragupta, the language of these communities in Andhra is mostly Odiya called Karnala bhasha and are also called Karnalu, Chitti Karnalu or Shristikarnalu.

Karuneegar of TamilNadu 

Sahay mentions that the poet Paarisanadhar wrote Karuneegar Purana during the Vallar Pandiyan era. Their holiest cite is the Shri Chitragupt Swamy Temple in Kanchipuram and they hold the belief to have descended from the presiding deity and have 64 gotras in the community. They are mainly devotees of Vallalar Shri Ramalinga Swamy of Vadalur. The famous Tamil saint, reformer and poet belonged to the community and to a line of Tamil saints known as "gnana siddhars".
Sircar mentions that they give great importance to mathematics, so much so that one of the subcaste is named Kanakkar which literally stands for Mathematics in Tamil.

References

Hindu surnames
Kayastha
Social groups of Bihar